The 2011–12 CEV Champions League was the 53rd edition of the highest level European volleyball club competition organised by the European Volleyball Confederation.

Participating teams

League round
24 teams were drawn to 6 pools of 4 teams each.
The 1st – 2nd ranked qualified for the Playoffs 12.
The organizer of the Final Four were determined after the end of the League Round and qualified directly for the Final Four.
The team of the organizer of  the Final Four was replaced by the 3rd ranked team with the best score.
The four next  3rd ranked teams moved to the CEV Cup. The remaining teams are eliminated.

All times are local.

Pool A

|}

|}

Pool B

|}

|}

Pool C

|}

|}

Pool D

|}

|}

Pool E

|}

|}

Pool F

|}

|}

Playoffs

Playoff 12

|}

First leg

|}

Second leg

|}

Playoff 6

|}

First leg

|}

Second leg

|}

Final Four
Organizer:  PGE Skra Bełchatów
 Place: Łódź
All times are Central European Time (UTC+01:00).

Semifinals

|}

3rd place match

|}

Final

|}

Final standings

Awards

Most Valuable Player
  Mariusz Wlazły (PGE Skra Bełchatów)
Best Scorer
  Maxim Mikhaylov (Zenit Kazan)
Best Spiker
  Bartosz Kurek (PGE Skra Bełchatów)
Best Server
  Maxim Mikhaylov (Zenit Kazan)

Best Blocker
  Nikolay Apalikov (Zenit Kazan)
Best Receiver
  Michał Winiarski (PGE Skra Bełchatów)
Best Libero
  Aleksey Obmochaev (Zenit Kazan)
Best Setter
  Valerio Vermiglio (Zenit Kazan)

External links
 2012 CEV Volleyball Champions League

CEV Champions League
2011 in volleyball
2012 in volleyball